Philip John Morrison (born 1 June 1977) is an English drift driver and businessman from Birmingham, England. He is one of the most successful drivers in UK drifting, having won the 2006 D1 Great Britain series and 2010 British Drift Championship and is co-owner of automotive parts company Driftworks.

Drifting career

Morrison started drifting in 2004, funding his interest in the sport by working for five years in a sixth form college as a technician. In 2006, Morrison won the D1 Great Britain Series in a Nissan 200SX S14. In 2008, Morrison debuted a new car, a mid-engined Nissan Silvia S15 powered by a 2JZ-GTE engine from a Toyota Supra in the European Drift Championship. He narrowly missed out on the 2009 EDC title, after spinning out in the Top 8 in the final round at Snetterton and handed the title to Mark Luney. The following season, Morrison won the 2010 British Drift Championship title at Knockhill.

The S15 was sold at the end of the 2012 BDC season, to be replaced by a world first LSx powered Toyota AE86, built with the remnants of an ASCAR race car.

Business career
Morrison is the co-owner of Driftworks Ltd alongside his business partner, James Robinson. The business was established out of a spare room in Morrison's home and has now grown into one of the largest suppliers of drift related parts in the UK, based out of a 12,000 sq ft facility in Tyseley, Birmingham.

References

External links
Driftworks

English racing drivers
D1 Grand Prix drivers
Drifting drivers
1977 births
Living people
21st-century English businesspeople
Auto racing executives